Jim Steigenberger (30 December 1911 – 3 August 1991) was an Australian rules footballer who played with Fitzroy and North Melbourne in the Victorian Football League (VFL).

After commencing the year with North Melbourne, Steigenberger was appointed as captain / coach the Balldale Football Club in 1937 (3rd) and 1938 (3rd) in the Chiltern & District Football Association. He then coached the Brocklesby Football Club to a famous Albury & District Football League premiership against Henty in 1939, after a free kick was awarded on the siren to Wally Crooks, who kicked a goal for Brocklesby to win by two points.

Steigenberger played with Port Melbourne in 1940 and 1941, but missed out on playing in their 1941 VFA premiership, after injuring his ankle in early September, 1941.

Steigenberger enlisted in the Australian Imperial Force (AIF) in Melbourne in June 1940.

Notes

External links 
1938 - Chiltern & DFA defeated Preliminary Finalists: Balldale FC team photo
1939 - Albury & District Football League Semi Final: Brocklesby FC team photo
1939 - Albury & District Football League Premiers: Brocklesby FC team photo
1941 VFA Premiers: Port Melbourne FC team photo
World War Two service record
		

1911 births
1991 deaths
Australian rules footballers from Victoria (Australia)
Fitzroy Football Club players
North Melbourne Football Club players
Mooroopna Football Club players
Oakleigh Football Club players